Events in the year 1926 in Belgium.

Incumbents
Monarch – Albert I
Prime Minister – Prosper Poullet (to 8 May); Henri Jaspar (from 20 May)

Events

 Refoundation of Orval Abbey
 7 January – Flooding along the river Meuse, particularly in Liège.
 21 January – The Belgian Parliament accepts the Locarno Treaties.
 31 January – Belgian troops withdraw from German occupation zone.
 8 May – Government led by Prosper Poullet falls.
 20 May – Government of national unity formed under Henri Jaspar.
 30 May – 15th Gordon Bennett Cup held in Antwerp.
 23 July – National Railway Company of Belgium founded.
 10 October – Municipal elections
 20 October – Treaty establishing free movement of labour between Belgium and Luxembourg signed at Luxembourg.
 4 November – Civil registration of wedding between Prince Leopold of Belgium, Duke of Brabant and Princess Astrid of Sweden in Stockholm
 10 November – Blessing of the union of Prince Leopold and Princess Astrid in Brussels minster.
 15 November – Inauguration of the equestrian statue of Leopold II in Brussels.

Publications
 Albert Giraud, Le Concert dans le musée
 Franz Hellens, Le Naïf

Art and architecture

Buildings
 Le Corbusier, Maison Guiette, Antwerp

Film
 De Boma à Tshela, a documentary silent film

Births
 4 February – Albert Frère, businessman (died 2018)
 20 February – Bobby Jaspar, jazz saxophonist (died 1963)
 27 February – Luc Alfons de Hovre, bishop (died 2009)
 21 March – André Delvaux, film director (died 2002)
 14 April – Henri Kichka, Holocaust survivor (died 2020)
 26 June – Paul Sobol, Holocaust survivor (died 2020)
 5 July – Éliane Vogel-Polsky, lawyer and feminist (died 2015)
 14 July – Guy Vandenbranden, artist (died 2014)
 16 July – Emile Degelin, film director and novelist (died 2017)
 27 August – Paula D'Hondt, politician
 29 August – Jean Bourguignon, inventor (died 1981)
 12 September – Paul Janssen, pharmacologist (died 2003)
 29 October – Maurice Blomme, cyclist (died 1980)
 30 October – Jacques Swaters, racing driver (died 2010)

Deaths
 23 January – Désiré-Joseph Mercier (born 1851), cardinal
 2 December – Gérard Cooreman (born 1852), prime minister
 14 December – Théo van Rysselberghe (born 1862), painter
 16 December – Hippolyte Fierens-Gevaert (born 1870), art historian
 27 December – François Poels (born 1881), trade unionist

References

 
1920s in Belgium
Belgium
Years of the 20th century in Belgium
Belgium